The 2008 AVP Pro Beach Volleyball Tour was a domestic professional beach volleyball circuit organized in the United States by the Association of Volleyball Professionals (AVP) for the 2008 beach volleyball season. The 2008 AVP calendar comprises the Hot Winter Nights Tour, an indoor beach volleyball circuit, and the main AVP Crocs Tour.

Schedule

Hot Winter Nights Tour
This is the complete schedule of events on the 2008 Hot Winter Nights calendar, with the players' final standings. Each event consisted of four invited men and women players competing in a one-night round-robin tournament in an indoor beach volleyball arena.

Men

Women

Crocs Tour
This is the complete schedule of events on the 2008 AVP Crocs Tour calendar, with team progression documented from the semifinals stage. All tournaments, with the exception of the Glendale Best of the Beach Invitational, consisted of single-elimination qualifying rounds followed by a double-elimination main draw. The Glendale Best of the Beach Invitational was a round-robin tournament.
Key

Men

Women

Milestones and events
Cincinnati Open
Misty May-Treanor and Kerri Walsh Jennings lost 19-21, 21-10, 23-25 to Nicole Branagh and Elaine Youngs in the finals, ending their record win streak of 112 consecutive matches and 19 straight tournaments that began in August 2007. The match lasted 1 hour and 45 minutes and was the second-longest women's match in AVP history at the time.

Awards

References

Association of Volleyball Professionals
AVP Pro Beach Volleyball Tour